Marta Cristina Schonhurst (born November 11, 1974 in Passo Fundo) is a retired Brazilian rhythmic gymnast.

She represented Brazil in the rhythmic gymnastics all-around competition at the 1992 Olympic Games in Barcelona. She was 41st in the qualification and didn't qualify for the final.

See also 
List of Olympic rhythmic gymnasts for Brazil

References

External links 
 Marta Cristina Schonhurst at Sports-Reference.com

1974 births
Living people
Brazilian rhythmic gymnasts
Gymnasts at the 1992 Summer Olympics
Olympic gymnasts of Brazil